Television in the United Arab Emirates began in 1969.

Overview
In 2011, the United Arab Emirates was the main headquarters to 72 free-to-air channels, falling slightly behind Egypt and Saudi Arabia in terms of the total number of channels within the Arab world. The United Arab Emirates also had 16 terrestrial channels, of which 13 are state-owned. 

Approximately 50% of viewers spend between one and three hours watching TV per day. Emirati nationals watch the highest amount of television, with 53% watching between three and six hours per day.

MBC channels are the most watched, particularly among expat Arabs, while Zee TV remains at the top among other expats due to the strong preponderance of South Asians in this group. Abu Dhabi TV is also a popular choice.

IPTV penetration was estimated at 33% in 2011. Although free-to-air television remains dominant, there has been an increase in the uptake of pay-TV, which is estimated at around 45%.

List of channels
 Al Emarat TV
 Abu Dhabi TV
 AD Drama
 AD Drama +
 AD Sports Channels
 Al Dafrah TV 
 Majid Kids TV
 Quest Arabiya
 Fujairah TV
 Ajman TV
 Dubai TV
 Dubai Zaman
 Dubai Sports
 Dubai One
 Sama Dubai
 Al Dafrah TV
 Noor Dubai
 Sharjah TV Bengal Digital (Bangladesh)
 Sharjah Sport
 Sharqiya from kalbaa
 Al Wousta from Al Dhaid
 Zee Alwan
 Zee Aflam
 ALAAN TV
 Al Sabeeha TV
 MBC Bollywood
 MBC Persia
 Awaan TV
 AD TV Smart TV

See also
 Radio and television channels of Dubai
 Dubai Media City

References

 
Television stations